Leslie Rosenthal Jacobs (born 1959, New Orleans, Louisiana) is an education reform advocate, business executive, and philanthropist. Born in New Orleans, she built her family's small, independent insurance agency into one of the largest in the South, before merging the Rosenthal Agency with Hibernia National Bank (now Capital One). For the last 25 years, she has been a passionate voice for education reform, serving initially as an elected member of the Orleans Parish School Board, and then, as a member of the State Board of Elementary and Secondary Education (BESE). She is also the founder of "Educate Now!", a non-profit dedicated to continuing the broad, post-Katrina reforms of New Orleans public schools she helped institute and execute as a member of the BESE.

Personal life 

Jacobs is married to Scott Jacobs. She is the mother to two young adult daughters.

The Rosenthal Agency 

Jacobs began work at her family's independent insurance agency in 1981 after graduating from Cornell University. Under her leadership, the company became one of the top 100 insurance brokers in the United States. In 2000, Hibernia National Bank purchased the agency, and Jacobs became President of the merged Hibernia Rosenthal Agency. She remained president until 2002. In 2006, Hibernia, the largest deposit holder in Southeast Louisiana, was  purchased by Capital One and re-branded under the Capital One banner.

Orleans Parish School Board 

In 1992, Jacobs ran for a position on the Orleans Parish School Board from District 6, a majority African-American district comprising much of southwestern Orleans Parish, including parts of Dixon, Uptown, Mid-City and the Black Pearl. She ran in an open primary and placed first, taking 29% of the vote, or about 3,575 votes. In the run-off election, Jacobs received 13,909 votes and defeated fellow Democrat Henry Julien 59% to 41%. She served on the board until 1996, and in her final year, served as board vice-president.

Board of Elementary and Secondary Education 

Jacobs was appointed in 1996 to the State Board of Elementary and Secondary Education. She was reappointed to this position in 2000 and served until 2008. Jacobs is credited as one of the prime architects for reform of Louisiana's Public Schools throughout the 1990s and 2000s (decade), including developing and implementing the number one ranked school accountability system in the country and implementing major steps to improve teacher quality. According to the 2009 Education Watch Report released by the Education Trust, Louisiana is the only state in which the gap between African American and white students has narrowed significantly in both 4th grade reading and 8th grade math.
 
As part of Louisiana's school accountability system, Ms Jacobs was instrumental in creating the Recovery School District (RSD) in 2003.  The RSD is administered by the Department of Education, and is designed to take over academically failing schools.
 
Prior to Hurricane Katrina, Orleans Parish Schools were the worst performing in the state. 63% of the Parish's schools were failing.  After Hurricane Katrina, Jacobs worked with Governor Blanco and State Superintendent Cecil Picard to place most of the Orleans public schools into the Recovery School District and to recruit high quality charter operators, like the Knowledge is Power Program (KIPP), to come to New Orleans and be part of the rebuilding.

Today, New Orleans has the largest percentage of public school students in charter schools in the nation (78%). Student performance has improved significantly in all measures: performance on state tests, reduction in the drop out rate, and percentage of seniors qualifying for Louisiana's merit based scholarship program.

President Barack Obama has praised the rejuvenation of Orleans Parish schools as a model for the rest of the country, stating: "And because a lot of your public schools opened themselves up to new ideas and innovative reforms, we're actually seeing an improvement in overall achievement that is making the city a model for reform nationwide."

Civic life 

Jacobs is on the board of several organizations and civic causes, including:
 Past chair of GNO Inc., a non-profit economic development corporation dedicated to cultivating the Greater New Orleans area's economy
 Vice-chair of the New Orleans Business Alliance
 Vice-chair of the New Orleans Business Council
 CEO of the New Orleans Startup Fund, a nonprofit venture fund focused on business creation and innovation in the 10-parish Greater New Orleans region.

She has also served on other boards, including
 Young Leadership Council
 CBNO/MAC
 The Idea Village

504ward 

Jacobs founded 504ward, a movement dedicated to retaining young professionals in the New Orleans area, in 2008. 504ward seeks to retain this talent as a key component to the long-term revitalization of New Orleans and a primary driver of a vibrant economy. Representatives from a broad spectrum of New Orleans organizations have united to address the issues pertinent to this 23- to 35-year-old demographic, such as career prospects, social engagement, and opportunity for impact.

Educate Now 

After leaving BESE, Jacobs formed Educate Now, a non-profit committed to maintaining and expanding reforms of Orleans Parish Schools instituted after Hurricane Katrina and during Jacobs' tenure on BESE.  Educate Now continues to press for "effective and sustainable reform" of schools in Orleans Parish.

Awards 

Jacobs has received numerous honors including:

National awards

"World's Most Powerful Educators," Forbes
"Top 50 Achievers," Jewish Daily Forward
Honors leaders and innovators in the American Jewish community.

Distinguished Service Award, National Association of State Boards of Education
Given annually to a state board of education member in recognition of outstanding service to public education.

Distinguished Service to State Government Award, National Governor's Association
Given by governors to their states' most valuable civil servants and private citizens, this award emphasizes the important contributions private citizens make to state government.
When nominating Jacobs for this award, Governor Foster stated, "The conversation about education in Louisiana is no longer about who to blame for our failures, but about making sure each child learns and each school succeeds and recognizing their improvement.  Leslie Jacobs changed that conversation; Leslie Jacobs changed the way public education in Louisiana works.  I am grateful for her service and proud to nominate her for this honor."

1995 Delegate to the British-American Project
One of 24 delegates selected to represent the United States in a conference with 24 British leaders to develop mutual understanding between future leaders of both nations.

"100 Leading Women," Business Insurance
Recognizes the top 100 women executives in the insurance industry.

Local awards

"Twenty People Who Influenced Louisiana 1981-2001," Louisiana Life Magazine
"Co-New Orleanian of the Year," Gambit Weekly
Given annually by Gambit Weekly to local New Orleanians who have made outstanding contributions to the metro area.

Boy Scouts of America, "Whitney Young, Jr. Award"
Presented for an outstanding contribution toward implementing opportunities for at-risk urban youth in the New Orleans area.

Young Leadership Council (YLC) Role Model
Awarded to 25 New Orleanians for making a difference in New Orleans and for providing an outstanding example for the young talent that the YLC represents.

Junior Achievement Business Hall of Fame Role Model
Recognized for entrepreneurial spirit and excellence in business leadership

YWCA Role Model
Louisiana Jaycee Outstanding Young Woman
"Women of the Year," New Orleans CityBusiness
Board of Directors Award for community service, Association of Fundraising Executives
Awarded for significant contribution through philanthropic programming to the betterment of the quality of life in New Orleans and in Louisiana.

References

1959 births
Living people
Businesspeople from New Orleans
Cornell University alumni
Jewish American philanthropists
21st-century American Jews